Runar Hauge (born 1 September 2001) is a Norwegian professional footballer who plays for Scottish Premiership club Hibernian as a winger. He has previously played for Bodø/Glimt, Grorud, Stjørdals-Blink in Norway, and for Irish club Dundalk. Hauge represented Norway in youth internationals up to the under-18 level.

Club career
Hauge began his club career with Bodø/Glimt. 

In January 2022 he was linked with a transfer to Scottish club Hibernian, and he signed for the club on 31 January. Hauge and Norwegian compatriot Elias Melkersen made their Hibernian debuts on 2 March 2022, both appearing as substitutes. Hauge was loaned to Irish club Dundalk in July 2022. He made his debut on 29 July 2022, in a 4–0 FAI Cup win over Longford Town at Oriel Park.

International career
Hauge is a Norway youth international.

Personal life
Hauge is the younger brother of Frankfurt player Jens Petter Hauge.

Career statistics

Honours

Club
Bodø/Glimt
Eliteserien (1):  2020

References

2001 births
Living people
Norwegian footballers
FK Bodø/Glimt players
Grorud IL players
Norwegian First Division players
Eliteserien players
Association football wingers
Norway youth international footballers
Sportspeople from Bodø
IL Stjørdals-Blink players
Hibernian F.C. players
Norwegian expatriate footballers
Norwegian expatriate sportspeople in Scotland
Expatriate footballers in Scotland
Scottish Professional Football League players
Dundalk F.C. players
Norwegian expatriate sportspeople in Ireland
Expatriate association footballers in the Republic of Ireland
League of Ireland players